There are many monuments to Queen Victoria, including:
Victoria Memorial (India)
Victoria Memorial, London
Victoria Monument (Liverpool)
Queen Victoria Memorial, Lancaster
Victoria Memorial (Montreal)
Queen Victoria Memorial (Melbourne)
Frogmore Mausoleum, Queen Victoria's burial place

See also
List of statues of Queen Victoria
Victoria Tower (Guernsey)
Victoria Memorial Hall (Singapore)
Victoria Memorial Museum (Ottawa)
Victoria Memorial Square (Toronto)